Armand Berton (16 September 1854, Paris - 1917) was a French painter, engraver and illustrator.

Bibliography

Geneviève Monnier, Musée du Louvre, Cabinet des Dessins. Musée d'Orsay. Pastels du XIXe siècle, Inventaire des collections publiques françaises, Paris, 1985.

Painters from Paris
Engravers from Paris
French illustrators
1854 births
1917 deaths